Alexander Doduk (born December 21, 1989) is an American voice actor and former child actor who is well known for his roles in the films: Barbie in the Nutcracker (2001), Scary Godmother (2003), The Impossible Elephant (2001) and in the Animated series Brain Powered. He was the first voice of Lan Hikari for 14 episodes (1-5, 9–17) on the English version of Megaman NT Warrior before Brad Swaile became the voice for Lan. Doduk has voiced in other English dubs of anime, such as Inuyasha and the Ocean dub of Escaflowne. He was also José on Cybersix. He provided the voice of Vega Obscura in the English version of Zoids: New Century Zero. In 2000, Doduk voiced Jake Spankenheimer in Grandma Got Run Over by a Reindeer.

Filmography
Moment of Truth: A Child Too Many (1993) (Television film) as Aaron Jr.
Dangerous Indiscretion (1995) as Matthew
Brothers Destiny (1995) (Television film) as Martin
Have You Seen My Son (1996) (Television film) as Ace Pritcher
The Rainbow Fish (1997) (Direct-to-video-film) as  Fish with Gray fins (Line: "You bet we have",Credited as Alex Doduck)
Dog's Best Friend (1997) (Television film) as Kid at School
Melty Lancer (1999) (Direct-to-video) as Rufus (Voice) (English Dub Only)
Grandma Got Run Over by a Reindeer (2000) as Jake Spankenheimer (Voice)
Kong (2000) 
Head over Heels (2001) as Boy with Crutches
The Impossible Elephant (2001) as Trout
Barbie in the Nutcracker (2001) (Direct-to-video) as Tommy (Voice)
Scary Godmother: Halloween Spooktakular (2003) (Credited as Alex Dodok) as Jimmy (Voice)

Television
The X-Files (1994) as Young Samuel (Episode: Miracle Man)
The New Adventures of Madeline (1995) Additional Voices (2000 only)
The Vision of Escaflowne(1996) as Prince Child (Voice) (English Dub, Bandai Entertainment dub)
Brain Powerd (1998) as Yukio (Voice) (English Dub)
Master Keaton (1998-1999) as Teen Charlie Chapman (Voice) (English Dub)
RoboCop: Alpha Commando (1998-1999) Various Voices
Cybersix (1999) as Jose (Voice)
Mugen no Rivaiasu (1999) as Charlie (Episode: Good Turtleland III) (Voice) (English Dub)
Rainbow Fish (2000) as Sherman Shrimp
Zoids (2001) as Vega Obscura (Voice) (English Dub)
X-Men: Evolution (2002) as Friendly Kid (Voice) (Episode: X-Treme Measures)
MegaMan NT Warrior (2003) as Lan Hikari (Voice) (English Dub)
Inuyasha (2001-2003) as Kohaku (Voice) (6 Episodes)
Gadget and the Gadgetinis (2003) Additional Voices (7 Episodes)
Kong: The Animated Series (2001-2005) as Young Jason (Voice) (2 Episodes)

External links
 

American male voice actors
American male child actors
Living people
1989 births